Alexandru Spiridon (born 20 July 1960, in Edineț) is a former professional footballer and current football manager from Moldova. Spiridon played as a midfielder during his football career, winning the Moldovan Footballer of the Year award in 1992. He made 16 appearances for the national team, scoring one goal. He worked as the assistant manager at Russian club Zenit St. Petersburg, joining the club in 2016 with manager Mircea Lucescu.

Career

Playing career

Spiridon played as a midfielder during his football career, winning the Moldovan Footballer of the Year award in 1992. He began his career at Nistru Chișinău, before moving to SKA Kiev in 1982. He scored 3 goals in 34 games for the club. Spiridon rejoined Nistru Chișinău in 1983 and played 19 times in his first season. He made 16 appearances the following year, and played 23 times for the club in 1985, scoring 4 goals. In 1986, he played 27 matches and scored 3 goals. He joined Zarya Bălți in 1987 and moved to Zimbru Chișinău in 1991. He was named the Moldovan Footballer of the Year award in 1992 and scored 12 goals in 30 appearances in the 1992-93 season. In the 1993-94 season, he scored 13 goals in 20 games for the club. He won 5 league titles in a row with the club between 1992 and 1996. He joined Tiligul Tiraspol in 1996 and ended his playing career with the club.

Spiridon made 16 appearances for the national team, scoring two goals. He played his last international match on 29 March 1995 in a 3-0 defeat to Albania.

Managerial career

Spiridon joined Ukrainian side Shakhtar Donetsk in 2004 as the assistant manager to Mircea Lucescu. Shakhtar won the Ukrainian Premier League title in the 2004-05 season. Shakhtar have won the league 7 times during Spiridon's time as assistant manager (2004–05, 2005-06, 2007-08, 2009-10, 2010-11, 2011-12, 2012-13). They have also won 4 Ukrainian Cup trophies (2007-08, 2010-11, 2011-12, 2012-13) and 5 Ukrainian Super Cup trophies (2005, 2008, 2011, 2012, 2013). Shakhtar also won their first European trophy in the 2008-09 UEFA Cup, the last UEFA Cup before its rebranding as the UEFA Europa League.

When on 24 May 2016, Mircea Lucescu signed a contract with Russian club Zenit Saint Petersburg, Spiridon also moved to that club as assistant manager to Lucescu.

International goals

Honours

As player
Zimbru Chișinău
 Divizia Națională
Champion (5): 1992, 1992–93, 1993–94, 1994–95, 1995–96
Runner-up (1): 1996–97

 Moldovan Cup
Winner (1): 1996–97

 Moldovan Footballer of the Year (1): 1992

As assistant manager
Shakhtar Donetsk
 UEFA Cup
Winner (1): 2008–09

 Ukrainian Premier League
Champion (8): 2004–05, 2005–06, 2007–08, 2009–10, 2010–11, 2011–12, 2012–13, 2013–14
Runner-up (4): 2006–07, 2008–09, 2014–15, 2015–16

 Ukrainian Cup
Winner (6): 2003–04, 2007–08, 2010–11, 2011–12, 2012–13, 2015–16

 Ukrainian Super Cup
Winner (7): 2005, 2008, 2010, 2012, 2013, 2014, 2015

Managerial statistics

References

External links
 
 
 
 
 
 Profile at Eurosport

1960 births
Living people
Soviet footballers
Moldovan footballers
Moldovan Super Liga players
FC Zimbru Chișinău players
SKA Kiev players
FC Zorya Luhansk players
Moldovan football managers
People from Edineț District
Moldova international footballers
Moldova national football team managers
FC Zimbru Chișinău managers
FC Nistru Otaci managers
FC Shakhtar Donetsk non-playing staff
Moldovan expatriate sportspeople in Ukraine
FC Zenit Saint Petersburg non-playing staff
Association football midfielders
Moldovan Super Liga managers